Andrena haemorrhoa  is a Palearctic species of mining bee.

References

External links
Images representing  Andrena haemorrhoa 

Hymenoptera of Europe
haemorrhoa
Insects described in 1781